Muhammad Bakhit al-Muti'i (1854 or 1856 — 1935) was the Grand Mufti of Egypt, judge in the Shari'a Courts, rector of al-Azhar, and one of the leading Hanafi-Maturidi scholars of his time. He was educated at al-Azhar and was teaching in this university for several years. In 1914 he was appointed mufti, a title he held for seven years. He was known as the bitterest foe of the Islamic Reform movement led by Jamal al-Din al-Afghani and Muhammad 'Abduh. He was also known as a devout scholar who chose to lose his position as mufti rather than bow to government pressure to issue a particular fatwa.

Bakhit studied at al-Azhar and taught there from 1875 to 1880, when he was appointed qadi (Muslim judge) of Qalyubiyya, after which he served as a judge in various provincial centers, Alexandria, and Cairo. He was appointed Egypt's chief mufti on 21 December 1914, serving until 1921. He opposed Muhammad 'Abduh's reforms at al-Azhar, issued a fatwa (Muslim legal opinion) to warn Muslims against bolshevism (presumably meaning politically inspired violence) in the midst of the 1919 Revolution, and took conservative stands on such issues as the translation of the Quran, women's rights, and the abolition of family awqaf. After he ceased to be the chief mufti, he attacked severely 'Ali 'Abd al-Raziq's al-Islam wa Usul al-Hukm (Islam and the Principles of Rule).

Biography 
He was born in the village of al-Muti'ah in Asyut Governorate. He studied Hanafi fiqh at al-Azhar from 1865 to 1875 and was among those who heard al-Afghani lecturing privately in the Muski district in Cairo. In 1880 he was appointed qadi, and in 1892 he was made Shari'a Legal Supervisor for the Ministry of Justice. The following year he became president of the al-Mahkama al-Shar'iyya (the Shari'a Court) in Alexandria, whereupon he was transferred to the Cairo court and became president of its technical council. He was finally appointed President of the Cairo al-Mahkama al-Shar'iyya al-'Ulya, in succession to the 'Abd Allah Jamal al-Din, who went with Hassunah al-Nawawi to the Khedive in Alexandria. In 1915, he was appointed Mufti of Egypt by the new Sultan Husayn Kamil.

Students 
Among his most celebrated students was 'Abdullah al-Ghumari.

Books 
He published numerous treatises on Islamic law and theology.

Among his well-known writings are:
 Tathir al-Fu'ad min Danas al-I'tiqad.
 Ahsan al-Kalam fima Yata'allaq bi al-Sunnah wa al-Bid'ah min al-Ahkam.

See also 
 Mustafa Sabri
 List of Hanafis
 List of Muslim theologians
 List of Ash'aris and Maturidis

Notes

References

External links
 A Brief Biography of Muhammad Bakhit al-Muti'i — Dar al-Ifta al-Misriyyah 
 A Brief Biography of Muhammad Bakhit al-Muti'i 

Hanafis
Maturidis
19th-century Muslim theologians
Grand Muftis of Egypt
Egyptian Sunni Muslims
Al-Azhar University alumni
Sharia judges
Critics of Ibn Taymiyya
20th-century Muslim theologians
1854 births
1856 births
1935 deaths